NSH Mountain Gold Timika is a basketball team based in Timika, Papua, Indonesia. NSH Mountain Gold Timika is the first team from Papua to join in the IBL Indonesia. Mountain Gold originally signed up as a new team for 2020 season's competition. However, the new team slot was only available for two teams (Bali United & West Badit), so Mountain Gold decided to merge with NSH Jakarta. NSH Mountain Gold has 3 native Papuan players, one of which is a player from the Amungme tribe usually known as Amungme people or Suku Amungme where it is one of the tribes in the Jayawijaya Mountains.

History

1994 - 2015: NSH GMC 
In 1994, the youths who lived in the ex-Gaya Motor Cilincing sports complex became the initiators for the establishment of a basketball club. They gave the name GMC which stands for Gaya Motor Club. The great enthusiasm shown by the youths touched Na Sioe Hauw's heart. A tin entrepreneur who was finally willing to fund the club. This collaboration resulted in a new club name used to participate in the competition, namely NSH GMC.

NSH GMC's achievements are satisfactory at the amateur level. In 2007, they won the Division II competition in DKI Jakarta. NSH GMC also received a promotion to Division I DKI Jakarta. In the following year, they were able to be in the second place at DKI Jakarta Division I competition and third in the National Championship Division I.
 
This success made NSH GMC promoted to Kobatama (Main Division Basketball Competition). As a result, they occupied seventh position. In 2010, they competed in PBL (Premiere Basketball League) in which they were finished sixth.

NSH GMC then participated in the Indonesian professional league in 2011. They joined NBL Indonesia (currently Indonesian Basketball League together with Pacific Caesar Surabaya in 2011 - 2012 Season. They used the name NSH GMC Riau. NSH has been consistently joined the Indonesian professional league to be shown until NBL was replaced by IBL. From there, NSH began to find its turning point in the team's achievements projected as Numbers of sponsors has approached NSH and it shown as well that NSH has been adjusting its logos in the following years.

2015 - 2019: NSH Jakarta
Starting from Maykel S.D. Ferdinandus (Coach Inyo) who succeeded in bringing NSH to enliven the 2016–2017 IBL playoff competition. Unfortunately, after that he resigned for the following season. But his successor, Wahyu Widayat Jati, managed to bring change for NSH for two consecutive seasons. At the its upward record of 2018–2020 IBL, NSH has won the Regular Season brought NHS to the playoffs season 2017–2018 Regular Season. Although in the end, NSH had to knocked out 1 - 2 in the semifinals against Satria Muda Pertamina Jakarta. in the following Season NSH Jakarta technically won regular season however due to Indonesian Patriots was not qualified to continue to the next round. NSH appeared short in the 2020 Preliminary Round.

2020 - Present: Mountain Gold Timika 
During off-season, Papuan newly team from Timika - Mountain Gold has acquired NSH Jakarta and changed its name to NSH Mountain Gold Timika. NSH Mountain Gold Timika became the first team from the east of Indonesia who joined the national competition Indonesian Basketball League for the first time in the history.

Head coach 
 Mayckel S.D Ferdinandus (2011–2017)
 Wahyu Widayat Jati (2017–2019)
 Antonius Rinaldo (2019-Present)

Roster

Individual Awards

Notable players
- Set a club record or won an individual award as a professional player.
- Played at least one official international match for his senior national team at any time.
  Tri Hartanto

References

Basketball teams in Indonesia
1994 establishments in Indonesia
Basketball teams established in 1994